Magnolia amazonica is a flowering evergreen tree of the family Magnoliaceae native to the lower western Amazon River Basin, including Peru and Brazil.

Description
Leaves are elliptic, 11 - 28.5 cm long and 4.2 - 10.5 cm broad. The creamy white fragrant flowers reportedly open at night, petals can be 6 – 7 cm long.

References

amazonica
Magnolia amazonica
Trees of Peru
Flora of Brazil
Trees of the Amazon
Plants described in 1925